Vagdanam is a 1961 Indian Telugu-language drama film, written and directed by Acharya Aatreya. The film stars Akkineni Nageswara Rao and Krishna Kumari, with music composed by Pendyala. It is based on the novel Datta, written by Saratchandra Chatterjee. The film was a box office failure.

Plot 
Vishwanatham (Nagayya) Zamindar, Ranganatham (Gummadi) his Diwan, and Jagannatham are three childhood friends. Since Jagannatham has married a low caste girl he has been ostracized from the village. But Vishwanatham always befriends him financially for his son Suryam's (Akkineni Nageswara Rao) education and promises to wedlock his daughter Vijaya (Krishna Kumari) with Suryam. It begrudges deceitful Ranganatham as he aspires to couple up Vijaya with his son Chandram (Chalam) a haughty. Suddenly, Jagannatham dies, and knowing it, Vishwanatham also passes away leaving Vijaya's responsibility to Ranganatham. Meanwhile, Suryam completes his medicine, returns, establishes a hospital, and serves the poor. Without knowledge, Suryam & Vijaya are acquainted and silently love. Being cognizant of it, Ranganatham clutches Vijaya in the prison by utilizing a power of attorney. At the same time, a Harikatha Bhagavathar Ramadasu (Relangi) lands along with his wife Balamani (Suryakantham) and son Padmanabham (Padmanabham). Here, Ramadasu's niece Radha (Girija) accompanies Suryam as a nurse and she is a friend of Vijaya as well. Parallelly a glimpse, love track of Padmanabham & Radha. Right now, Ramadasu wishes to construct a Rama Mandir to which Vijaya approves. Exploiting it, Ranganatham ploys and creates conflicts between Suryam & Vijaya by auctioning his hospital for debt taken by Jagannatham. At present, Suryam strives by constructing a camp and continues his service. Being aware of it, Vijaya repents but she is helpless. Moreover, Ranganatham slanders the relationship of Suryam & Radha which Vijaya too believes. During that plight, Ramadasu makes a play, as a result, Vijaya learns the truth, the real intention of her father, and the evil plans of Ranganatham. Finally, the movie ends on a happy note with the marriages of Suryam & Vijaya and Padmanabham & Radha.

Cast 
Akkineni Nageswara Rao as Suryam
Krishna Kumari as Vijaya
Gummadi as Ranganatham
Chalam as Chandram
V. Nagayya as Zamindar Vishwanatham
Relangi as Ramadasu
Padmanabham as Padmanabham
Suryakantham as Balamani
Girija as Radha
Surabhi Kamalabai as Bujjamma

Soundtrack 
Music composed by Pendyala. "Sri Nagaja Tanayam", penned by Sri Sri, is considered one of the first songs describing Seeta Kalyanam in Harikatha format.

References

External links 
 

1960s Telugu-language films
1961 films
Films based on works by Sarat Chandra Chattopadhyay
Films scored by Pendyala Nageswara Rao
Indian black-and-white films